Velada is the name of the healing vigils carried out by Mazatec curanderos (such as María Sabina). The rituals involved the use of psilocybin (magic mushrooms) or Salvia divinorum to commune with God and experience enlightenment.

History
In May 1957, the banker and ethnomycologist R. Gordon Wasson published an article in the Life, Seeking the Magic Mushroom, describing his first experience consuming the mushroom and following the Velada of a shaman back in 1955. He claimed to be among the two first modern Western men to follow a traditional Velada ritual on psilocybin. His tale inspired a generation of «mycotourists» seeking to experience the authentic Mazatec Veladas.

Wasson's curandero was Maria Sabina. She was seen as a traitor by her community and rejected. She had received rock stars such as John Lennon, Mick Jagger, and Bob Dylan to follow the Mazatec Velada, which had led to an international exposition of the Mazatec's entheogenic secrets.

See also
Seeking the Magic Mushroom
Mazatec people
Curandero
María Sabina

References

Bibliography

  

Shamanism of the Americas
Mesoamerican medicine
Mazatec